Jolyon F. Stern (born December 25, 1939) is President of the DeWitt Stern Group, Inc., a commercial insurance broker founded in 1899 by his grandfather, DeWitt H. Stern.

Biography
Jolyon entered the insurance business directly after graduating from [Oberlin College]. He learned his craft from an underwriter’s perspective by joining Fireman’s Fund Insurance Company. He then joined DeWitt Stern in 1963, and, in 1974 became the President - the third generation to lead the firm.

The firm that Jolyon’s grandfather began writes insurance for clients in highly specialized fields such as film, theater, and fine art. DeWitt Stern also has specialists who provide insurance coverage for cooperatives and condos, group and individual health plans, homeowner’s, personal liability, and others.

Yet, it was Jolyon’s love for the arts helped him establish DeWitt Stern as one of the leaders in the world of Entertainment Insurance, as noted in a 2004 article in the insurance industry magazine Rough Notes: "Jolyon Stern himself is also quite attuned to the entertainment environment as an alumnus of Oberlin College, known for its performing arts program. And, he is married to Nelle Nugent, a multiple Tony award winner. Ms. Nugent has produced some 30 Broadway shows."

Among the insurance coverages handled by the firm’s entertainment, film, and media practice are: cast insurance; entertainment insurance; film insurance; special events insurance; props, sets, and wardrobe insurance; and many others. Its fine art practice provides clients with art dealers and galleries insurance; fine art collections and coverage for valuable articles, among others.

"We believe we have earned a reputation for finding innovative solutions to the frequently out-of-the ordinary, last-minute challenges faced by entertainment businesses. We can minimize financial impact when a shooting is delayed, the star is unable to perform or when unforeseen events impact a production. We have decades of experience in providing insurance and risk management services to the performing arts and venues, including a leading role as broker to Broadway productions." 
-->
Jolyon is a member of the Board of Trustees of The American Academy of Dramatic Arts, Roundabout Theatre Company, the New Dramatists, and  a Director of the Swedish American Chamber of Commerce of New York,.

References

1939 births
American businesspeople in insurance
American chief executives of financial services companies
Princeton University alumni
Living people